Yamacrow Creek is a stream in the U.S. state of Mississippi.

Yamacrow Creek most likely is named after the Yamacraw tribe, using a different spelling.

References

Rivers of Mississippi
Rivers of Wilkinson County, Mississippi
Mississippi placenames of Native American origin